Carlyle Witton-Davies (10 June 1913 – 25 March 1993) was an Anglican priest and scholar.

He was born the son of  T. Witton-Davies, Professor of Hebrew at the University College of North Wales, Bangor and educated at Friars School, Bangor; University College of North Wales, Bangor; Exeter College, Oxford;and Ripon College Cuddesdon.

He was ordained in  1938 and began his ecclesiastical career with a curacy at  Buckley. From 1940 to 1944 he was Subwarden of St. Michael's College, Llandaff. From then until 1949 he was a Canon Residentiary at St. George's Cathedral, Jerusalem. In that year he became Dean and Precentor  of St David's. His last senior post was as Archdeacon of Oxford ((1957–1982).

One of the last clerics to wear the traditional frock coat and gaiters, he died aged 79.

References

1913 births
People educated at Friars School, Bangor
Alumni of Bangor University
Alumni of Exeter College, Oxford
Alumni of Ripon College Cuddesdon
Welsh Anglicans
Deans of St Davids
Archdeacons of Oxford
1993 deaths